ORP Wilk was the lead boat of her class of mine-laying submarines of the Polish Navy. The ship saw service in the Polish Navy from 1931 to 1951. Her name meant "Wolf" in Polish.

History
Wilk was laid down in 1927 at Chantiers et Ateliers Augustin Normand shipyard at Le Havre in France. Launched on April 12, 1929, she was commissioned into the Polish Navy on 31 October 1931.

When World War II began on September 1, 1939, Wilk, commanded by Captain Boguslaw Krawczyk, took part in the Worek Plan for the defence of the Polish coast, operating in Gdańsk Bay. On September 2 she spotted a destroyer Erich Steinbrinck, but could not attack it, because she fell herself under attack by minesweepers (the German report on firing a torpedo at Steinbrinck is not confirmed by the Poles). On September 3 she deployed her mines as planned. On September 4 and 5 the Wilk was under continuous depth charge attacks and had to lay on the sea bottom during daytime, suffering minor damage. During the next days, attempts at attacking enemy shipping were unsuccessful. Then she left the Polish coast, successfully passing the Danish straits (Øresund) on September 14/15, escaping from the Baltic Sea and arriving in Great Britain on September 20. Only  managed to accomplish the same feat later; the other three Polish submarines were interned in neutral Sweden.

On December 7, 1939 one of the mines laid by the submarine in September sank a German fishing boat MFK Pil 55 Heimat (13 GRT) at position .

In February, 1940 the ORP Wilk was involved in an incident in the Kattegat. She was reported to have sunk a German U-boat, damaged another, and was then depth-charged for thirty hours. The Royal Navy Liaison Officer onboard, Sub. Lt. Cyril Branson R.N., got the Captain to surface and assisted in bringing the badly damaged Wilk safety back to Rosyth. Sub. Lt. Branson was later awarded the Cross of Valour for his role in this action.

Collision
On June 20, 1940 at 0.25 am, the ORP Wilk rammed an unidentified object at position . There was a long dispute upon this incident. The commander reported, that the Wilk had collided with a submarine. The 2nd in command Sub. Lt. Bolesław Romanowski, being the officer of the watch then, reported, that he had seen a "triangular shape". However, in his post-war memoirs "Torpeda w celu" he claimed, that he deliberately rammed a German U-boat. The other submarine , lost after June 21, was too far away. If submarines are considered, most probably would be the Dutch submarine , also lost in that area around that time.

However, according to newest analysis of Wilk's damages and all reports, the object was most likely German minefield protector buoy (Sprengboje), since only both Wilk's propellers got damaged, while a rudder and rudder's connector below them, were intact, which was unlikely in case of ramming a submarine. Moreover, searching of the O 13 wreck in area of the Wilk's reported collision was fruitless.

Further career
The Wilk undertook nine patrols from the British bases, without success. The last was between 8 and 20 January 1941, then the submarine was assigned to training duties. Due to her poor mechanical condition, ORP Wilk was decommissioned as a reserve submarine on April 2, 1942.

On 28 September 1946 the Polish government-in-exile gave Wilk to British control. She remained laid up at Harwich. Because of her poor condition, only in October 1952 she was towed to Poland. She was declared unfit to service, decommissioned from the Polish Navy, and scrapped in 1954.

References

Bibliography
Marek Twardowski (in Polish): "Podwodne drapieżniki" – stawiacze min typu Wilk ("Undersea predators" – Wilk class minelayers), in: Morza, Statki i Okręty nr. 3/1998, pp. 23–26

External links
 

Wilk-class submarines
World War II submarines of Poland
1929 ships
Ships built in France